Clea were an English girl group whose members met on the television show Popstars: The Rivals in 2002. Chloe Morgan (née Staines), Lynsey Brown, Emma Beard and Aimee Kearsley decided to form a band after they were voted off the series. The name 'Clea' is an acronym of the first letter of each member's name.

History
They initially had a management contract with Upside Management a company set up by former BMG / Sony employee's Denise Beighton and Simon Jones and recording contract with Warner offshoot 1967 Records and released their first single, "Download It", in 2003. It entered the UK Singles Chart at number 21 and the band spent the remainder of the year playing small concerts in the United Kingdom.

In February 2004, the band released their second single, "Stuck in the Middle" which reached number 23 in the UK Singles Chart. They continued playing, including appearances at Soccer 6 in Liverpool and Reading. In May of that year, Chloe Morgan left the group to pursue her solo career. 

Clea's debut album, Identity Crisis was released in Russia, Eastern Europe and in certain countries in Asia. In these regions, the band had seen some moderate interest; however, due to being unsuccessful, they were dropped from 1967 Records in late 2004. Clea were continued to be managed by Upside Management and released music independently through a specially created label.

In September 2005, Clea collaborated with production group Da Playaz to release a single, named "We Don't Have To Take Our Clothes Off" a dance remake of the Narada Michael Walden song originally made famous by Jermaine Stewart. This single reached number 35 on the UK chart. "Lucky Like That", released in June 2006, was the band's fourth single. This single placed at number 55 on the UK chart. Trinity, Clea's second album (but first UK album), was released on 3 July on Upside Records. Lynsey Brown left the band in November 2006. They then released the double a-side single "Stuck in the Middle"/"I Surrender" in Europe and toured Asia and Scandinavia in 2007. They also signed to EMI China and toured there on several occasions.

In November 2022, all four Clea members reunite in celebration of their twentieth anniversary, and the group was officially added to the lineup of Mighty Hoopla 2023.

After Clea
Aimee Kearsley, who now resides in London, has continued working in music as a successful songwriter since leaving the group. In 2011 she joined girlband Fanfair. Performing initially at rugby union games across the UK and performing at Twickenham Stadium, they went on to tour the UK and Ireland on The Wanted sell-out arena tour "The Code". The band was represented by 84 World, Dan Parker (formerly of Syco Entertainment). The band became brand ambassadors for Collection Makeup, releasing a single called "Mission" as part of a Collection TV commercial campaign in the UK. In 2013 the girls disbanded after failing to secure a record deal. Aimee is currently working as a music producer and songwriter in the UK.

Morgan is currently living in Vancouver, Canada. Following the release of her debut solo EP, Piano Forté, Morgan has begun writing and recording her first full-length album to be released in late 2013. Brown has pursued a different career. Beard appeared as a contestant on Paris Hilton's British Best Friend, she made it to the finale and came third. She recorded a new solo single, "Vanity"; the video to support the release was directed by Lauren Pushkin, and produced by PMA Digital.

Discography

Albums
 Identity Crisis (2004)
 Trinity (2006)

Singles

References

External links
 Clea on Myspace
 Clea forum

English girl groups
English dance music groups
English pop music groups
British pop girl groups
Musical groups established in 2002
Musical groups disestablished in 2007
2002 establishments in England
2007 disestablishments in England